Stearns may refer to:

Places in the United States
Stearns, Kentucky
Stearns, Wisconsin
Stearns County, Minnesota
Stearns Scout Camp
Stearns Wharf, Santa Barbara, California

Others
Stearns (automobile)
Stearns (crater), a lunar crater named after Carl Leo Stearns
Stearns (surname)
2035 Stearns, an asteroid named after Carl Leo Stearns

See also

Stearnes (disambiguation)
Sterns (disambiguation)